Tanah Lot is a rock formation off the Indonesian island of Bali. It is home to the ancient Hindu pilgrimage temple Pura Tanah Lot (literally "Tanah Lot temple"), a popular tourist and cultural icon for photography.

Tanah Lot temple
Tanah Lot means "Land [in the] Sea" in the Balinese language. Located in Tabanan, about  North West of Denpasar, the temple sits on a large offshore rock which has been shaped continuously over the years by the ocean tide.

Tanah Lot is claimed to be the work of the 16th-century Dang Hyang Nirartha. During his travels along the south coast he saw the rock-island's beautiful setting and decided to rest there. Some fishermen saw him, and bought him gifts. Nirartha then spent the night on the little island. Later he spoke to the fishermen and told them to build a shrine on the rock, for he felt it to be a holy place to worship the Balinese sea gods. The main deity of the temple is Dewa Baruna or Bhatara Segara, who is the sea god or sea power and these days, Nirartha is also worshipped here.

The Tanah Lot temple was built and has been a part of Balinese mythology for centuries. The temple is one of seven sea temples around the Balinese coast. Each of the sea temples was established within eyesight of the next to form a chain along the south-western coast. In addition to Balinese mythology, the temple was significantly influenced by Hinduism.

At the base of the rocky island, venomous sea snakes are believed to guard the temple from evil spirits and intruders. The temple is purportedly protected by a giant snake, which was created from Nirartha's selendang (a type of sash) when he established the island.

Restoration 
In 1980, the temple's rock face was starting to crumble and the area around and inside the temple started to become dangerous. The Japanese government then provided a loan to the Indonesian government of Rp 800 billion (approximately US$480 million) to conserve the historic temple and other significant locations around Bali. As a result, over one third of Tanah Lot's "rock" is actually cleverly disguised artificial rock created during the Japanese-funded and supervised renovation and stabilization program..

Tourism 

Entrance tickets cost 20,000 Rupiah for Indonesian nationals (Rp 15,000 for children), but foreigners have to pay three times the price, or Rp 60,000 (Rp  30,000 for children). To reach the temple, visitors must walk through a set of Balinese market-format souvenir shops which cover each side of the path down to the sea. On the mainland clifftops, restaurants have also been provided for tourists.

Location 
This tourist attraction is located in Beraban, Kediri, Tabanan, approximately 13 kilometers (8 miles) south of Tabanan.

See also 

 Indonesian architecture
 Hindu temple architecture

Notes

References

External links 

 

Tourist attractions in Bali
Tabanan Regency
Hindu temples in Indonesia
Archaeological sites in Indonesia